The Democratic Republican Party (DRP) was a conservative, broadly corporatist and nationalist political party in South Korea, ruling from shortly after its formation on February 2, 1963 to its dissolution under Chun Doo-hwan in 1980.

History
Under the control of Park Chung Hee, President of South Korea from his military coup d'état of 1961 until his assassination in 1979, the party oversaw a period of corporatism and developmentalism, known as the "Miracle of the Han River", where a predominantly poor and agrarian country was transformed into an industrial "tiger economy". The combination of state and corporate chaebol power pioneered by the party continues to be deeply built into the foundations of the South Korean economic system.

Following the promulgation in October 1972 of the Yushin Constitution, which implemented numerous authoritarian centralizing measures such as the direct appointment of a third of the National Assembly by the President, the DRP assumed an unprecedented level of political power.  For the next eight years, South Korea was essentially a one-party state ruled by the DRP.

After Park's assassination on 26 October 1979 and the seizure of power by Chun Doo-hwan in the coup d'état of December Twelfth, the DRP was dissolved on 1 September 1980, and nominally superseded by the Korean National Party. However, leadership of the state was assumed by the Democratic Justice Party, formed in January 1981, which is seen as the spiritual successor of the DRP in terms of its constitutional vision and mimicking of Park's leadership style. Through evolution, the Grand National Party is seen by many as the modern heir to the DRP, though the policies advocated by South Korean conservatives have changed significantly since South Korea's democratization in the late 1980s and early 1990s.

Election results

President

Legislature

References

Defunct political parties in South Korea
Fourth Republic of Korea
Conservative parties in South Korea
Far-right politics in South Korea
National conservative parties
Political parties established in 1963
Political parties disestablished in 1980
Right-wing populism in South Korea
Right-wing populist parties
Liberty Korea Party
Park Chung-hee